Irvine Boocock (27 February 1890 – 1941) was an English professional footballer who made over 160 appearances in the Football League for Bradford City as a left back. He represented the Football League XI.

Sporting career
Born in Cleckheaton, Boocock began his football career with non-League club Sunfield Rovers, before joining First Division club Bradford City in March 1910. Either side of the First World War, Boocock made 184 appearances and scored one goal for the Bantams. He finished his career with a short spell at Third Division North club Darlington, whom he joined in June 1922.

Boocock also played cricket for hometown club Cleckheaton between 1909 and 1932 and later served the club as groundsman and bar steward. He also played for Moorend and Eccleshill.

Personal life 
Boocock served as a corporal in the West Yorkshire Regiment during the First World War. He served in five different battalions, including the Leeds Rifles and a Bradford Pals battalion.

Career statistics

References

1890 births
People from Cleckheaton
English footballers
Bradford City A.F.C. players
Darlington F.C. players
English Football League players
Association football fullbacks
1941 deaths
British Army personnel of World War I
West Yorkshire Regiment soldiers

English Football League representative players
English cricketers